The XM1219 Armed Robotic Vehicle was an unmanned ground combat vehicle based on the MULE Platform. The ARV-A-L MULE Vehicle (XM1219) would feature integrated anti-tank and anti-personnel and reconnaissance, surveillance, and target acquisition (RSTA) systems remotely operated by network linked soldiers. The Armed robotic vehicle was canceled in July 2011 over mobility concerns.

Design
 The MULE platform is controlled by a modified Xbox 360 controller for ease of training recruits familiar with console controllers.

Mobility
Transportable inside a C-130 Hercules and CH-47 Chinook.
Transportable, slung under a UH-60 Black Hawk.
Climb more than a  step.
Cross a  gap.
Traverse side slopes of 40 percent.

Variants

Assault
The only production variant of this vehicle was the Assault Light (ARV-A-L).

Reconnaissance, Surveillance and Target Acquisition
The Reconnaissance, Surveillance and Target Acquisition or (RSTA) was likely canceled at some point.

See also
 Foster-Miller TALON
 Gladiator Tactical Unmanned Ground Vehicle
 SGR-A1
 MGM-166 LOSAT, a canceled U.S. Army line-of-sight missile
 Mobile Protected Firepower, an ongoing U.S. Army light tank acquisition program
 XM1202 Mounted Combat System, a U.S. Army Future Combat Systems 20-ton tank canceled in 2011
 M1134 Anti-Tank Guided Missile Vehicle, a Stryker tank destroyer variant

References

Lockheed Martin: ARV-A-L

Future Weapons and https://www.youtube.com/watch?v=8qDo6ehxKds 5:30 into video.

Abandoned military projects of the United States
Military robots
United States Army vehicles
Unmanned ground combat vehicles